Miguel Ángel Martínez Martínez (born 30 January 1940, in Madrid) is a Spanish politician and Member of the European Parliament for the Spanish Socialist Workers' Party, part of the Party of European Socialists. Martínez Martínez is a Vice Chair of the ACP-EU Joint Parliamentary Assembly.

He was the first full-time and paid Secretary General of the International Falcon Movement - Socialist Education International the children's international of the Socialist Group (1966–1972), Vice-President of the WEU Assembly (1986–1996). Vice-President (1983–1992) and President (1992–1996) of the Parliamentary Assembly of the Council of Europe. He also represented Ciudad Real Province in the Spanish Congress of Deputies from 1977 to 1999.

External links
Miguel Ángel Martínez Martínez at the European Parliament

1940 births
Living people
Spanish Socialist Workers' Party MEPs
MEPs for Spain 1999–2004
MEPs for Spain 2004–2009
MEPs for Spain 2009–2014
Members of the constituent Congress of Deputies (Spain)
Members of the 5th Congress of Deputies (Spain)
Members of the 1st Congress of Deputies (Spain)
Members of the 2nd Congress of Deputies (Spain)
Members of the 3rd Congress of Deputies (Spain)
Members of the 4th Congress of Deputies (Spain)
Members of the 6th Congress of Deputies (Spain)